İkinci Hal (The Latter State) is the seventh studio album by Turkish singer Bengü. It was released by DMC on 17 October 2014.
It features notable pieces by Mustafa Ceceli, Erdem Kinay and Şehrazat, and vocals by Emre Aydın on the song "Kadar". The album's lead single "Sahici", written by Zeki Güner, became a number-one hit on the charts and the song "Feveran" was one of the huge hits during the summer of 2015.

Critical reception

The reception of İkinci Hal was rather good and people enjoyed the musical change of Bengü's sound. LoneReviewer website praised Bengü's professionalism and the production of chartbusters "Sahici" and "Feveran" but criticized lack of coherence and weakness of some compositions.

Track listing

Sales

References

External links
 

2014 albums
Bengü albums